Prelà is a comune (municipality) in the Province of Imperia in the Italian region Liguria, located about  southwest of Genoa and about  northwest of Imperia.

Prelà borders the following municipalities: Borgomaro, Carpasio, Dolcedo, Montalto Ligure, and Vasia.

Demographic evolution

Twin towns — sister cities
Prelà is twinned with:

  Châteauneuf-Grasse, France (2005)

References

Cities and towns in Liguria